This article is about the demographic features of the population of the Faroe Islands, including population density, ethnicity, education level, health of the populace, economic status, religious affiliations and other aspects of the population.

 The vast majority of the population are ethnic Faroese, of North Germanic descent. Ethnic Faroese are, in genetic terms, among the most homogenous groups ever found.

A 2004 DNA analysis revealed that Y chromosomes, tracing male descent, are 87% Scandinavian. The studies show that mitochondrial DNA, tracing female descent, is 84% Scottish/Irish.

Of the approximately 48,000 inhabitants of the Faroe Islands (16,921 private households (2004)), 98% are Danish realm citizens, meaning Faroese, Danish, or Greenlandic. By birthplace one can derive the following origins of the inhabitants: born on the Faroes 91.7%, in Denmark 5.8%, and in Greenland 0.3%. The largest group of foreigners are Icelanders comprising 0.4% of the population, followed by Norwegians and Poles, each comprising 0.2%. Altogether, on the Faroe Islands there are people from 77 different nationalities. The Faroe Islands have the highest rate of adoption in the world, despite a relatively high fertility rate of 2.6 children. 

Faroese is spoken in the entire country as a first language. It is not possible to say exactly how many people worldwide speak the Faroese language.

The 2011 census, called Manntal, shows that 10% were not born in the Faroe Islands, but of these only 3% were born outside the Kingdom of Denmark. 6.5% of people older than 15 did not speak Faroese as their mother tongue. 33 persons said that they did not understand Faroese at all. According to the 2011 census, 45 361 Faroese people (people living in the Faroes) spoke Faroese as their first language and 1546 spoke Danish as their first language.

The Faroese language is one of the smallest of the Germanic languages. It is most similar to Icelandic and Norwegian. In the twentieth century Faroese became the official language and since the Faroes are a part of the Danish realm Danish is taught in schools as a compulsory second language.

Faroese language policy provides for the active creation of new terms in Faroese suitable for modern life.

Vital statistics since 1900

Current vital statistics

CIA World Factbook demographic statistics 
The following demographic statistics are from the CIA World Factbook, unless otherwise indicated.

Age structure
 0–14 years: 19.89% (male 5,214/female 4,878)
 15–24 years: 14.34% (male 3,738/female 3,538)
 25–54 years: 37.31% (male 10,252/female 8,676)
 55–64 years: 11.69% (male 3,054/female 2,878)
 65 years and over: 16.76% (male 4,111/female 4,391) (2017 est.)

Sex ratio
 at birth: 1.07 male(s)/female
 0–14 years: 1.07 male(s)/female
 15–24 years: 1.05 male(s)/female
 25–54 years: 1.18 male(s)/female
 55–64 years: 1.06 male(s)/female
 65 years and over: 0.94 male(s)/female
 total population: 1.08 male(s)/female (2017 est.)

Infant mortality rate
5.4 deaths/1,000 live births (2017 est.)

Life expectancy at birth
 total population: 79.85 years (2012 est.)
 male: 77.37 years
 female: 82.50 years

Total fertility rate
 2.4 children born/woman (2012 est.)

Nationality
 noun: Faroese (singular and plural)
 adjective: Faroese

Ethnic groups
– Faroese (mixed Scandinavian – Celtic)

– Danes

Religions
 Christianity

Languages
The official languages are Faroese (derived from Old Norse), and Danish

People in the Faroe Islands by language in 2011 according to the Faroese census of 2011, named Manntal

Number of all residents of the Faroe Islands who were asked to reply to the questions from Manntal in November 2011: 48.345
Faroese: 45.361
Danish 1.546
 Other Scandinavian languages, including Icelandic: 411
Other European languages: 607
Asian languages: 290
Languages from the Middle East and North Africa: 40
Other African languages: 31
Sign language:18
No language: 41

Literacy
definition:
NA
total population:
NA%
male:
NA%
female:
NA%
note:
similar to Denmark proper

Population by island

See also
 Faroe Islands
 List of Faroese people

References 

 
Society of the Faroe Islands